Uropterygius is a genus of moray eels in the family Muraenidae.

Species
There are currently 20 recognized species in this genus:
 Uropterygius concolor Rüppell, 1838 (Unicolor snake moray)
 Uropterygius fasciolatus (Regan, 1909) (Blotched moray)
 Uropterygius fuscoguttatus L. P. Schultz, 1953 (Brown spotted snake moray)
 Uropterygius genie J. E. Randall & Golani, 1995
 Uropterygius golanii McCosker & D. G. Smith, 1997
 Uropterygius inornatus Gosline, 1958 (Drab snake moray)
 Uropterygius kamar McCosker & J. E. Randall, 1977 (Barlip reef-eel)
 Uropterygius macrocephalus (Bleeker, 1864) (Needle-tooth moray)
 Uropterygius macularius (Lesueur, 1825) (Marbled moray)
 Uropterygius marmoratus (Lacépède, 1803) (Marbled reef-eel)
 Uropterygius micropterus (Bleeker, 1852) (Tidepool snake moray)
 Uropterygius nagoensis Hatooka, 1984
 Uropterygius oligospondylus I. S. Chen, J. E. Randall & K. H. Loh, 2008
 Uropterygius polyspilus (Regan, 1909) (Large-spotted snake moray)
 Uropterygius polystictus G. S. Myers & Wade, 1941 (Many-spotted moray)
 Uropterygius supraforatus (Regan, 1909) (Many-toothed snake moray)
 Uropterygius versutus W. A. Bussing, 1991 (Two-holes moray)
 Uropterygius wheeleri Blache, 1967
 Uropterygius xanthopterus Bleeker, 1859 (Freckleface reef-eel)
 Uropterygius xenodontus McCosker & D. G. Smith, 1997 (Black snake moray)

Formerly included species
 Anarchias cantonensis – formerly Uropterygius cantonensis

References

 
Muraenidae
Ray-finned fish genera